Keywords Studios plc is an Irish video game industry services company based in Leopardstown. Founded in 1998 by Giorgio Guastalla and Teresa Luppino, the company initially provided localisation services for business software before transitioning to the video game industry. Andrew Day replaced Guastalla as chief executive officer in 2009 and the company completed its initial public offering on the London Stock Exchange in 2013. Since then, Keywords has acquired several other companies, including GameSim, D3T, Heavy Iron Studios, and High Voltage Software.

History 
Giorgio Guastalla, an Italian-Irish businessman who had previously worked for Microsoft's Dublin office, founded Keywords Studios in 1998 with his wife, Teresa Luppino. The company was established in Leopardstown (a suburb of Dublin) under the name Keywords International and originally provided localisation services for business software. A regional office in Rome was established in 2001.

Starting in 2004, Keywords became incrementally involved with the video game industry. Andrew Day, a Johannesburg native and long-time friend of Guastalla, joined Keywords in March 2009 at Guastalla's request and became the company's chief executive officer (CEO). Day perceived the supplier side in the video game market as highly fragmented and intended to turn Keywords into a "one-stop shop" for various stages of video game development. Furthermore, the company had heavily relied on a single client, which Day aimed to change. He instituted a five-year plan that was to lead to flotation in 2014 and shifted the company's focus entirely towards video games. The previously major client significantly reduced its business with Keywords in 2010. Further regional offices were opened in Tokyo in December 2009, in Montreal in 2010, and in Seattle in 2012.

In June 2013, Keywords announced its intent to float and sell 56% of its shares on the Alternative Investment Market of the London Stock Exchange. As part of this, a new entity, Keywords Studios Limited, was incorporated in the UK. On 8 July, the new entity was renamed Keywords Studios plc, and it acquired all of the previous entity, Keywords International Limited. Numis Securities served as financial adviser and ran the offer, and Keywords Studios floated on 12 July, raising . Prior to the flotation, PEQ Holdings (a company associated with Guastalla, Giacomo Duranti, and Marco De Sanctis) owned 75.1% of shares, with the remaining 24.9% owned by Day. Through the flotation, PEQ Holdings' ownership was reduced to 29.9% and Day's to 13.2%. Cazenove Capital Management acquired 12% of the company, alongside other investments by Artemis and Legal & General.

With the initial public offering completed, Day eyed an acquisition-based approach to corporate growth. Its first acquisition was that of Liquid Violet, a provider of voice production services, in January 2014. At the end of 2016, Keywords Studios had 2,600 employees, including 120 at its Dublin headquarters. The acquisition of VMC in October 2017 added 1,300 employees to Keywords' headcount. According to Davy Group, this acquisition turned Keywords into the largest provider of functionality quality assurance. In July 2018, Keywords announced the creation of Keywords Ventures, a venture capital fund aimed at supporting startups. Its first investment under this fund was in AppSecTest, of which Keywords acquired a 45% stake. In the same month, Igor Efremov was hired as chief creative officer and Andrew Brown as chief marketing officer. Jon Hauck was hired as Keywords' chief financial officer in November 2019, replacing David Broderick after he announced his resignation. At the onset of the COVID-19 pandemic in 2020, Day and Hauck took a 20% pay cut. Staff criticised the company's handling of the situation, stating that the operations had remained largely the same despite health concerns. In May that year, the company raised  with the aim of acquiring firms weakened by the pandemic.

In January 2021, Keywords Studios hired Sonia Lashand Sedler as its chief operating officer. Citing health reasons, Day took a temporary leave in March 2021, with Hauck and Sedler becoming joint interim CEOs. In June, Keywords Studios announced Day's impending retirement and that he had formally stepped down as CEO and member of the board of directors, remaining on the board in an advisory role for six months. Bertrand Bodson, the former chief digital officer for Novartis, succeeded Day on December 1, 2021.

Corporate affairs 
Keywords Studios is headquartered at Whelan House in the South County Business Park of Leopardstown. The company employs 9,493 people as of 2021. The largest single shareholder in Keywords Studios as of April 2019 is PEQ Holdings, itself 90%-owned by Guastalla, at 6.3% of shares worth . Italicatessen, a food import business founded by Guastalla and Luppino in 2002, provides catering services for Keywords Studios.

Operations 
According to Day, Keywords does not release products under its own name and does not plan to ever do so, which contributes to it staying "under the radar". The company's businesses are divided into seven segments: art, engineering, functional testing, audio recording, translation, localisation, and player support.

Accolades 
At the 2019 Technology Ireland Awards, Keywords received the "company of the year" and "outstanding achievement in international growth" awards.

References

External links 
 

 
2013 initial public offerings
Companies based in Dublin (city)
Companies listed on the London Stock Exchange
Irish companies established in 1998
Translation companies
Video game companies established in 1998
Video game companies of Ireland